Delphinium gypsophilum is a species of larkspur known by the common name Pinoche Creek larkspur. It is endemic to California, where it grows throughout the central part of the state in woodland and grassland. This wildflower generally reaches between one half and one meter in height. Its pale whitish-green stem is topped with cylindrical inflorescences of up to 30 flowers on short pedicels. The flowers are chalk-white, sometimes drying to a faint blue. Occasional individuals bear pink or light blue flowers. The spur is one to one and a half centimeters long.

External links
Jepson Manual Treatment
Photo gallery

gypsophilum
Endemic flora of California
Flora without expected TNC conservation status